Shelton "Shelly" Glen Berg (born August 18, 1955) is an American classical and jazz pianist and music educator. He is the dean of the Frost School of Music at the University of Miami in Coral Gables, Florida and the school's Patricia L. Frost Professor of Music.

Early life and education
Berg was born in Cleveland, the son of entrepreneur and jazz trumpeter Jay Berg. At age six, he entered the Cleveland Institute of Music, studying classical piano with Maxine Priest. At age nine, he composed his first work for a children's choir and orchestra at the opening of a synagogue. His father took him to sit in at jazz jam sessions beginning at age 12. He was introduced to gospel piano by organist Ricky C. Watkins, son of Pentecostal Church Bishop Charles Watkins, who recorded for Savoy, Praise, and LaCross. In middle school he played piano for Heights Youth Theater and summer stock musicals. He was also an accompanist for the vocal group Happiness Unlimited.

At age 15, Berg moved with his family to Houston, where he continued classical piano studies with Lucien Lemieux. He performed at jam sessions with jazz saxophonist Arnette Cobb and with Gatemouth Brown. He was the student conductor for choirs at Clear Creek High School and played French horn and trumpet in the band.

Berg earned a Bachelor of Music in Piano Performance (1977) and a Master of Music in Piano Performance (1979) from the University of Houston School of Music, where he studied piano with Albert Hirsh and Abbey Simon, and was the student conductor for choir and orchestra. During his freshman year he substituted for a week with the Woody Herman Band. He lectured at the University of Houston from 1979 to 1981 and was a teaching assistant in music theory from 1977 to 1979.

Career

San Jacinto College (1981 to 1991)
Berg began his career at San Jacinto College North in  Northshore, Houston, Texas, as chair of instrumental music from 1979 to 1981. He then served as chair of instrumental music and commercial music at San Jacinto College in Pasadena, Texas from 1981 to 1991. He performed with trumpeter Larry Martinez and singer Marilyn Savage in Larry and Marilyn and the Brass Connection  He learned to play Latin montunos from Kido Zapata during this time. He composed and arranged music for regional and national advertising campaigns and worked with Mickey Gilley and Bill Watrous.

University of Southern California (1991 to 2007)
In 1991, Berg moved to Los Angeles to join the music faculty at the University of Southern California Thornton School of Music. He was the McCoy/Sample endowed professor of jazz from 2004 to 2007, chair of Jazz Studies from 1994 to 2004, professor from 1998 to 2007, associate professor from 1995 to 1998, and assistant professor from 1991 to 1995.

International Association for Jazz Education president (1996 to 1998)
Berg was president of the International Association for Jazz Education from 1996 to 1998. He was named one of three "Educators for the Millennium" by The Los Angeles Times in 1999 and received the Dean's Award for Scholarship and Research from the USC Thornton School of Music in 2005.

Compositions and productions (1993 to present)
He wrote Jazz Improvisation: The Goal-Note Method (Kendor), the Chop-Monster jazz improvisation series (Alfred), Essentials of Jazz Theory series (Alfred), and co-wrote Rhythm Section Workshop for Jazz Directors (Alfred) plus arrangements for big band published by Kendor and Walrus.

Berg worked with Hollywood studio arranger Dick Marx and Tom Halm at Sunset Sound Recording Studios. He was a composer and arranger for the CBS television series A League of Their Own (1993), the weekly ABC television series Fudge (1995–1997), and was orchestrator for the motion picture Almost Heroes. He recorded with the Shelly Berg Trio, including The Joy (DMP, 1995), The Will: A Tribute to Oscar Peterson (CARS, 1998), and Blackbird (Concord, 2005).  In 2006, he arranged songs on the album Ray Sings, Basie Swings (Concord, 2006) and was music director and pianist on the Great Performances television show We Love Ella! A Tribute to the First Lady of Song (PBS, 2007).

University of Miami Frost School of Music dean (2007 to present)
In 2007, Berg was named dean of Frost School of Music at the University of Miami in Coral Gables, Florida. He is a teacher for the Frost Experiential Music Curriculum. Berg is a Steinway artist, music director of The Jazz Cruise, artistic advisor to Larry Rosen's JazzRoots Series at the Adrienne Arsht Center for the Performing Arts of Miami-Dade County, and host of the monthly Generation Next radio show on Sirius XM.

Awards and honors
 Grammy Award nomination, Best Instrumental Arrangement Accompanying Vocalist(s), "Out There" by Lorraine Feather, Tales of the Unusual
 Grammy Award nomination, Best Instrumental Arrangement Accompanying Vocalist(s), "What a Wonderful World" by Gloria Estefan, Gloria Estefan: The Standards, 2014 
 Grammy Award nomination, Best Arrangement Instrumental and Vocals, "Be My Muse" by Lorraine Feather, Flirting with Disaster, 2015
 Grammy Award nomination,  "There's a Boat that's Leaving Soon for New York/I Loves You Porgy" by Clint Holmes, Rendezvous, 2017
 Educators for the Millennium, The Los Angeles Times, 1999
 Berk Leadership Award, International Association of Jazz Educators, 2002
 Jazz Educator of the Year, Los Angeles Jazz Society, 2003
 Number one jazz album, Blackbird, at JazzWeek, 2005  
 Proclamation Honoring Leadership in the Arts, City of Miami, 2009  
 Oro Valley Legend of Jazz Award, South Arizona Arts & Cultural Alliance, 2010
 Inside Out Award, University of Miami Alumni Association, 2011 
 Jazz Education Achievement Award, DownBeat magazine, 2011
 Knight Arts Champion, John S. and James L. Knight Foundation, 2017 
 12 Good Men 2017 Honoree, Ronald McDonald House Charities, 2017 
 Champion of the Arts Award, Citizens Interested in the Arts, 2017

Discography

As leader
 The Joy (DMP, 1996)
 The Will (CARS, 1997)
 First Takes (Azica, 2005)
 Blackbird (Concord Jazz, 2005)
 Meeting of Minds with Dick Hyman (Victoria, 2008)
 The Nearness of You (Arbors, 2009)
 The Deep (Chesky, 2017)
 Gershwin Reimagined (Decca, 2018)

As sideman
With Lorraine Feather
 Ages (Jazzed Media, 2010)
 Attachments (Jazzed Media, 2013)
 Dooji Wooji (Sanctuary, 2005)
 Flirting with Disaster (Jazzed Media, 2015)
 Language (Jazzed Media, 2008)
 Math Camp (Relarion, 2018)
 Such Sweet Thunder (Sanctuary, 2003)
 Tales of the Unusual (Jazzed Media, 2012)

With Bill Watrous
 Bone-ified (GNP Crescendo, 1992)
 A Time for Love (GNP Crescendo, 1993)
 Space Available (Double-Time, 1997)

With others
 Patti Austin, Sound Advice (Shanachie, 2011)
 Carmen Bradford, Home with You (Azica, 2004)
 Ray Charles & Count Basie, Ray Sings Basie Swings (Hear Music/Concord, 2006)
 Bruce Eskovitz, Regions (Backstage, 2003)
 Renee Fleming, Christmas in New York (Decca, 2014)
 Keb Mo, Moonlight, Mistletoe & You (Concord, 2019)
 Kiss, Psycho Circus (Mercury, 1998)
 Monica Mancini, Ultimate Mancini (Concord, 2004)
 Rich Matteson, Pardon Our Dust We're Making Changes (Four Leaf Clover, 1990)
 Arturo Sandoval, A Time for Love (Concord Jazz, 2010)
 Arturo Sandoval, Dear Diz (Concord Jazz, 2012)
 Livingston Taylor, Safe Home (Chesky, 2017)

Film, television, video, podcast, and radio
As composer / arranger / orchestrator / performer / musical director

References

External links
Official site
Shelly Berg Interview NAMM Oral History Library (2019)

1955 births
Living people
Jazz musicians from Ohio
Musicians from Cleveland
20th-century American male musicians
20th-century American pianists
21st-century American male musicians
21st-century American pianists
American jazz pianists
American male jazz musicians
American male pianists
Cleveland Institute of Music alumni
USC Thornton School of Music faculty
University of Houston alumni
University of Miami faculty